The Foraker Formation (or Foraker Limestone) is a geologic formation in Nebraska, Kansas, and Oklahoma. It preserves fossils dating to the Carboniferous period.

See also

 List of fossiliferous stratigraphic units in Kansas
 List of fossiliferous stratigraphic units in Nebraska
 List of fossiliferous stratigraphic units in Oklahoma
 Paleontology in Kansas
 Paleontology in Nebraska
 Paleontology in Oklahoma

References

Carboniferous geology of Oklahoma
Carboniferous Kansas
Carboniferous geology of Nebraska
Carboniferous southern paleotropical deposits